Tony Lee is an actor.  He attended Le Conte High School in Los Angeles, went to college at the University of California at Berkeley, and graduated with a degree in law from the University of California at Los Angeles.  He has been admitted to the State Bar of California. He currently works for Cunningham Lindsey as a Customer Service Officer.

Lee has been playing mostly non-recurring roles in various television series since 2000 when he made an appearance in The West Wing episode entitled "Han". Lee had a reoccurring stint on Lost, where he played Jae Lee for several episodes. He is also well known for playing his role as Tony Lee in the Nickelodeon television sitcom Just Jordan. He also had a role on JAG.

External links

Year of birth missing (living people)
Living people
American male television actors
Male actors from Los Angeles